Victoire Jasmin (born 23 December 1955) is a French Socialist politician. She represents Guadeloupe in the French Senate.

Early life 
She was born in Morne-à-l'Eau.

Medical career 
Jasmin worked as a nurse in Pointe-à-Pitre.

Political career 
She was elected in the 2017 French Senate election.

During the COVID-19 pandemic in Guadeloupe, she called on the French government to appease the growing social unrest on the island.

Political views 
She opposes mandatory vaccination.

Personal life 
She is the mother of 3 children.

References 

1955 births
Living people
21st-century French women politicians
French Senators of the Fifth Republic
French nurses
Senators of Guadeloupe
Women members of the Senate (France)
Socialist Party (France) politicians
Guadeloupean socialists